Jacquelyn Ellen "Jaclyn" Smith (born October 26, 1945) is an American actress and businesswoman. She is best known for her role as Kelly Garrett in the television series Charlie's Angels (1976–1981), and was the only original female lead to remain with the series for its complete run. She reprised the role with cameo appearances in the films Charlie's Angels: Full Throttle (2003) and Charlie's Angels (2019). Her other films include Nightkill (1980) and Déjà Vu (1985). Beginning in the 1980s, she began developing and marketing her own brands of clothing and perfume.

Smith began her career in 1968 in minor roles. In 1976, she was cast in Charlie's Angels, alongside Kate Jackson and Farrah Fawcett. The show propelled all three to stardom, including an appearance on the front cover of Time magazine. She was nominated for the Golden Globe for Best Actress in a Miniseries or TV Film for the title role in the TV film Jacqueline Bouvier Kennedy (1981), and went on to star in numerous TV films and miniseries over the next 20 years, including Rage of Angels (1983), George Washington (1984), The Bourne Identity (1988), Kaleidoscope (1990) and Nightmare in the Daylight (1992). She had a recurring role from 2002 to 2004 in the drama series The District and appeared as Olivia Hodges in two episodes of CSI: Crime Scene Investigation in 2012.

Early life
Jacquelyn Ellen Smith was born in Houston, Texas, the daughter of Margaret Ellen (née Hartsfield) and Jack Smith (born Jacob Kupferschmidt), a dentist. Her father was of Russian-Jewish descent, whereas her mother had English, Scottish, Irish, and Welsh heritage. She graduated from Mirabeau B. Lamar High School in 1964. She majored in psychology and drama at Trinity University (Texas) in San Antonio but completed only a year. Instead, she moved to New York and joined the Balanchine School of American Ballet.

Smith's career aspirations shifted to modeling and acting as she found work in television commercials and print ads, including one for Listerine mouthwash. She was reportedly offered the role of Victoria Winters on the ABC daytime series Dark Shadows in 1968 but turned it down. She landed a job as a "Breck girl" for Breck Shampoo in 1971, and a few years later joined the model/actress Farrah Fawcett as a spokesmodel for Wella Balsam shampoo.

Career

Early career
First appearing uncredited in Goodbye, Columbus (1969), Smith had a noticeable role in The Adventurers (1970), in which she played a journalist. Both movies were filmed in 1968. Smith followed these up with guest spots on shows like The Partridge Family, McCloud, Switch and The Rookies. She was in the made-for-television movies Probe (1972) and Bootleggers (1974).

Charlie's Angels

On March 21, 1976, Smith first played Kelly Garrett in Charlie's Angels; the show was aired as a movie of the week, starring Smith, Kate Jackson and Farrah Fawcett as private investigators for Townsend Associates, a detective agency run by a reclusive multi-millionaire whom the women had never met. Voiced by John Forsythe, the Charles Townsend character presented cases and dispensed advice via a speakerphone to his core team of three female employees, to whom he referred as "Angels". They were aided in the office and occasionally in the field by two male associates, played by character actors David Doyle and David Ogden Stiers. The program earned a huge Nielsen rating, causing the network to air it a second time and confirm production for a series, with all of the principal characters with the exception of Stiers. The series formally debuted on September 22, 1976, and ran for five seasons. The show would become a big success not only in the U.S. but, in successive years, in syndication around the world, spawning a cottage industry of peripheral products, particularly in the show's first three seasons, including several series of bubble gum cards, two sets of fashion dolls, numerous posters, puzzles, and school supplies, novelizations of episodes, toy vans, and a board game, all featuring Smith's likeness. The "Angels" also appeared on the covers of magazines around the world, from countless fan magazines to TV Guide (four times) to Time magazine.

Fawcett departed at the end of the first season, and Cheryl Ladd was a successful addition to the cast, remaining until the end of the series. Jackson departed at the end of the third season, and proved harder to replace, as first Shelley Hack and then Tanya Roberts were brought in to try re-igniting the chemistry, media attention and ratings success enjoyed by the earlier teams. Smith played her role for all five seasons of Charlie's Angels until 1981, also portraying the Garrett character in a cameo in the 2003 feature film Charlie's Angels: Full Throttle and later in the 2019 film Charlie's Angels. Christina Chambers portrayed Smith in the 2004 television film Behind the Camera: The Unauthorized Story of Charlie's Angels.

In 1977 on the first episode of the Aaron Spelling produced comedy, The San Pedro Beach Bums, the Bums try to recruit the women of Charlie's Angels to judge the Miss Harbor Beauty Contest. The "Angels" – Smith, Jackson and Ladd – guest-star as themselves.

Interim work
Smith's first acting venture outside the Angels mold (as an actress of note) was the CBS-TV movie of the week Escape from Bogen County in 1977. Then came a leading role in Joyce Haber's The Users with Tony Curtis and John Forsythe in 1978. In 1980, Smith starred with Robert Mitchum in the suspense thriller Nightkill. Following the cancellation of Charlie's Angels in 1981, Smith starred in the title role of the critically acclaimed television movie Jacqueline Bouvier Kennedy, earning her a Golden Globe nomination for Best Actress. In 1983, Smith starred as Jennifer Parker in the TV movie Rage of Angels, based on the novel by Sidney Sheldon. The film was the highest rated in the Nielsen ratings the week it aired. Smith reprised the role in the 1986 sequel, Rage of Angels: The Story Continues.

After Charlie's Angels

Smith continued to appear in a number of television movies and miniseries during the 1980s and 1990s including George Washington, The Night They Saved Christmas (both 1984), Florence Nightingale (1985), Windmills of the Gods (1988) – another TV film based on a Sidney Sheldon novel – The Bourne Identity (also 1988); adapted from author Robert Ludlum's novel of the same name; Settle the Score (1989), Lies Before Kisses, The Rape of Dr. Willis (both 1991), In the Arms of a Killer (1992), and several TV versions of Danielle Steel novels, including Kaleidoscope (1990) and Family Album (1994).

In 1985, Smith starred in the feature film Deja Vu, directed by her then-husband Tony Richmond. In 1989, she played the title role in Christine Cromwell, a mystery television series based in San Francisco, but which only lasted one season. That same year, she received a star on the Hollywood Walk of Fame.

From 2002 to 2004, Smith had a recurring role as Vanessa Cavanaugh in the TV series The District. She reprised her role as Kelly Garrett for a cameo in the 2003 feature film Charlie's Angels: Full Throttle, the only "angel" from the original series to appear in a film adaptation. In August 2006, Smith reunited with her angels co-stars Farrah Fawcett and Kate Jackson at the 58th Primetime Emmy awards in tribute to producer Aaron Spelling who died earlier that year. Her appearance there subsequently led Bravo TV's producers to cast Smith as the celebrity host of Bravo's weekly competitive reality series Shear Genius, which began airing in March 2007. Smith hosted the show for its first two seasons.

In March 2010, Smith returned to acting after a five-year absence with a guest role on the NBC television drama Law & Order: Special Victims Unit. In March 2012, Smith guest-starred on CSI: Crime Scene Investigation as Olivia Hodges, the mother of David Hodges (played by Wallace Langham).

In January 2019, Smith was seen promoting the Charlie's Angels television series on the MeTV network. She reprised her role as Kelly for a cameo appearance in the 2019 feature film Charlie's Angels, Smith's second cameo in the film franchise.

Designing
In 1985, Smith entered the business world with the introduction of her collection of women's apparel for Kmart. She pioneered the concept of celebrities developing their own brands rather than merely endorsing others. A season 15 episode of The Simpsons ("The Fat and the Furriest") lampooned Smith's many business successes, portraying her as having her own line of axe heads. In May 2009, Smith allowed a documentary crew to profile her home life, design philosophy and relationship with Kmart in an online video series sponsored by Kmart. Her foray into home furnishings was extended to Kmart stores in the fall of 2008, with the chain's introduction of its Jaclyn Smith Today product line of bedding and bath accessories.

In September 2008, Smith launched the STYLE by Jaclyn Smith wig collection for Paula Young Wigs. The wigs are designed by hair stylist José Eber.

Personal life
Smith has been married four times. Her first marriage was to actor Roger Davis (1968–1975). She married Dennis Cole, an actor who appeared on Charlie's Angels in 1977 and 1978. Cole appeared on the show two more times before the couple divorced in 1981. Cole's son from a previous marriage, Joe Cole, with whom Smith had maintained a relationship after her divorce from his father, was murdered in 1991 during a robbery; the case remains unsolved. In 1981, Smith married filmmaker Tony Richmond, with whom she had two children, Gaston (born 1982) and Spencer Margaret (born 1985), before divorcing Richmond in 1989. Smith has been married to Houston cardiothoracic surgeon Brad Allen since 1997.

Smith was treated for breast cancer in 2003. In 2010, Smith was featured in 1 a Minute, a documentary about breast cancer.

Filmography

Films

Television series

Television appearances

Tributes
 A number of style editorialists and magazine polls have attested to Smith's popularity and declared her one of the most beautiful women in the world. The difficult-to-please Mr. Blackwell once named her "The World's Best Dressed Woman". In 1979, McCall's ran a poll of "Whose Face Most Women Would Like To Have"; Smith topped the list.
 In the April 1984 issue of People, Smith was voted as having one of the "Ten Great Faces of Our Time".
 In 1985, McCall's named Smith as having one of "America's 10 Best Bodies". People named Smith twice in its annual list of the "Most Beautiful People in the World". Also in 1985, Ladies' Home Journal sampled 2,000 men and women in 100 different locations in the United States to determine "America's Favorite Women"; Smith came top of the list as the "Most Beautiful Woman in America", with actress Linda Evans coming in second.
 In 1991, TV Guide readers voted Smith as the "Most Beautiful Woman Not on Television".
 The French band Air was inspired by Smith's Charlie's Angels character Kelly Garrett to record the song "Kelly Watch the Stars" for their critically acclaimed 1998 album Moon Safari, and the track was released as a single.

References

External links

 
 
 
 
 Jaclyn Smith Feature in Energy Times Issue July/August 2009
 

1945 births
Living people
American businesspeople
American film actresses
American people of English descent
American people of Irish descent
American people of Russian-Jewish descent
American people of Scottish descent
American people of Welsh descent
American television actresses
American female models
Actresses from Houston
Lamar High School (Houston, Texas) alumni
Actresses from Texas
School of American Ballet alumni
Trinity University (Texas) alumni
20th-century American actresses
21st-century American actresses
Participants in American reality television series